Pretty may refer to:

Beauty, the quality of being pleasing, especially to look at
Physical attractiveness, of a person's physical features

Arts, entertainment, and media
 Pretty (advertisement), a 2006 television advertisement for Nike Women
 "Pretty (Ugly Before)", a 2003 song by Elliott Smith
 "Pretty", a song on the Gigolo Aunts album Tales from the Vinegar Side
 "Pretty", a song on the Korn album Follow the Leader
 "Pretty", a song on the Nicky Byrne album Sunlight
 "Pretty", a song on The Cranberries album Everybody Else Is Doing It, So Why Can't We?
 "Pretty", a song by Nicole Scherzinger that leaked in 2016
 "Pretty", a song on the Weeknd's album Kiss Land
 "'Pretty", a song by Naaz from her EP Bits of Naaz

People
 Pretty John (1890–1964), Finnish forest laborer and storyteller
Charles Fenn Pretty (1865–1940), Canadian forestry businessman
 David Pretty (born 1951), Australian rules footballer
 Diane Pretty (1958–2002), British euthanasia campaigner
 Edith Pretty (1883–1942), English landowner and amateur archaeologist
 Harold Pretty (1875–1952), English cricketer
 Walter Pretty (1909–1975), Royal Air Force air marshal
 Wayne Pretty (born 1936), Canadian rower

See also
 Pretty Baby (disambiguation)
 Pretty Boy (disambiguation)
 Pretty Creek, Hickman County, Tennessee
 Pretty Girl (disambiguation)
 Pretty Lady (disambiguation)
 Pretty Little Liars (disambiguation)
 Pretty Woman (disambiguation)
 Pretties, a 2005 novel by Scott Westerfeld